The brown-capped tyrannulet (Ornithion brunneicapillus) is a species of bird in the family Tyrannidae. It is found in Colombia, Costa Rica, Ecuador, Panama, and Venezuela. Its natural habitats are subtropical or tropical moist lowland forests and heavily degraded former forest.

References

brown-capped tyrannulet
Birds of Costa Rica
Birds of Panama
Birds of the Tumbes-Chocó-Magdalena
Birds of Colombia
Birds of Venezuela
brown-capped tyrannulet
Taxonomy articles created by Polbot